Yeonsan Station is a railroad stations in South Korea.

 Yeonsan Station (Busan)
 Yeonsan Station (Nonsan)